The 1912–13 season was the first season in which Swansea Town (now known as Swansea City) took part in league and cup football. The club was elected to Division Two of the Southern Football League.

Swansea's first official match was played on 7 September 1912 against local rivals Cardiff City at the Vetch Field. All of Swansea's home games for the 1912–13 season were played on a 'Clinker pitch'.

After a 24-game season the club finished third, narrowly missing out on promotion. The club also entered the Welsh Cup and won it at the first attempt, beating Pontypridd 1–0 in a re-played final.

Southern Football League 

Source:

League table

Welsh Cup 

Source:

Player details 

Source:

Transfers

Out

See also

References 
General
 

Bibliography

 
 

Specific

1912-13
English football clubs 1912–13 season
Welsh football clubs 1912–13 season
1912–13 in Welsh football